Bobbie Merveille (born 1983) better known by her stage names DJ Heavygrinder and Marie Vaunt is an American disc jockey.

Biography
Merveille was born in Seattle, Washington to a French-American father and a Japanese mother. She was raised in Japan's Kanagawa Prefecture, where she lived until the age of 14. While in her teens, her parents decided that she would receive education in America.
She soon got involved in the art of DJing after returning to the US. In regards to this period, DJ Heavygrinder stated:

The genres of music she plays are house, electronica, indie, and trance. Her musical mentors and strongest influences include Cannibal Corpse, Pantera, Deicide, Justice, Gackt, Larc En Ciel, The Prodigy, Jamiroquai, Ryuichi Sakamoto, and Daft Punk.

Although she worked as an actress during her years in Japan, she has very little or no interest in acting. In several interviews, she has stated:

DJ Heavygrinder also performed at AnimeMatsuri in Houston,TX in March 2011, as well as March 2014.

Discography

Albums
 Eternity (2008)

EPs
 Setsuna (2016)
 Shadow Chaser (2013)

Singles
 Sway (2012)
 Lovesick Hypocrite (2013)
 Disguise (2013)
 Superstar (2013)
 The Riot (2013)
 Warning Destruction (2014)
 Black Is A Color (2014)
 Save You (2014)
 Break Free (2016)

Collaborations & remixes

Personal life
She currently resides in Los Angeles, California and is married to fellow producer and DJ, Katfyr.

References

External links
 
 
 DJ Heavygrinder on The Belmont Sessions
 DJ Heavygrinder at Discogs
 DJ Heavy Grinder Interview at Crash.tv.com

1983 births
Female models from Washington (state)
Club DJs
Dubstep musicians
Electro house musicians
American electronic musicians
American musicians of Japanese descent
American women DJs
21st-century Japanese actresses
American models of Japanese descent
Musicians from Los Angeles
Musicians from Seattle
Living people
Electronic dance music DJs
Rock DJs
21st-century American women musicians